The Order of the Cross of the Eagle was instituted in 1928  by the Estonian Defence League to commemorate the tenth anniversary of Estonian independence. It was adopted as a state order in 1936. The Order of the Cross of the Eagle is bestowed to give recognition for military services and services in the field of national defence. It is awarded in civil and military divisions.  The awards made to members of the military are denoted by the addition of crossed swords to the decoration.

Classes

The Order of the Cross of the Eagle comprises eight classes:
 Five basic classes - 1st, 2nd, 3rd, 4th and 5th class;
 Three medal classes - crosses in gold, silver and iron;

The crosses of all the classes of the Order of the Cross of the Eagle have the same design.

The colour tone of the orange moiré ribands belonging to the decorations of all the classes of the Order of the Cross of the Eagle is determined according to the international PANTONE colour-table as 137 MC.

The Order of the Cross of the Eagle is a military decoration if two crossed swords are affixed to it as follows:
The cross has crossed swords movably attached at the hilts of the swords to the tips of the top arms of the cross. The length of the swords together with their hilts is 35 mm for the 1st, 2nd and 3rd class decorations and 33 mm for the 4th and 5th class decorations and the gold, silver and iron crosses;
The star has crossed swords affixed to the oblique rays of the star and the vertical and horizontal rays remain uncovered. The swords are set hilts down. The length of each sword is 85 mm.
The medals of the affiliated crosses of the Order of the Cross of the Eagle have swords in the same metal as their cross.

Gallery

References

External links

 List of recipients

Orders, decorations, and medals of Estonia
Awards established in 1928
1928 establishments in Estonia